Boldt may refer to:

Alwin Boldt (1884–1920), German Olympic cyclist
Carl Boldt (1932–2015), American basketball player
David Boldt (1918–2007)
Georg Boldt (1862–1918), Finnish philosopher of religion and socialist
George Boldt (1851–1916), Prussian-born entrepreneur 
George Hugo Boldt (1903–1984), United States federal judge
Gerhard Boldt (1918–1981), German officer and author
Harry Boldt (born 1930), German dressage competitor
Herman E. Boldt (1865–1941), member of Wisconsin senate
Jean Boldt (1865–1920), Finnish theosophist and anarchist
Joachim Boldt (born 1954), German anaesthetist and former professor
Marius Boldt (born 1989), Norwegian footballer
Paul Boldt (1885–1921), German poet
Ryan Boldt (born 1994), American baseball player
Ryan Boldt, Canadian folk-rock and country-rock musician
Sidney Boldt-Christmas (born 1924), Swedish sailor

See also 
Boldt Decision
Boldt Castle
George C. Boldt Yacht House
Boldt Hall